UC2 may refer to:

 
 , a German World War I submarine
 German Type UC II submarine of World War II
 , a Danish private diesel-electric submarine
 uranium acetylide (UC2) see Uranium carbide
 .uc2, archive format for the UltraCompressor II; see List of archive formats

See also
 UCC (disambiguation)
 UC (disambiguation)